The Weißach is a , right-hand, eastern tributary of the Bregenzer Ach in the German and Austrian Alps. It forms a very short section of the Austria–Germany border, just south of the confluence with the Eibelebach. It flows into the Bregenzer Ach near Doren.

See also
List of rivers of Bavaria
List of rivers of Austria

References

External links 

Rivers of Bavaria
Rivers of Vorarlberg
Rivers of Austria
Rivers of Germany
Austria–Germany border
International rivers of Europe
Border rivers